Two ships of the Royal Navy have been named HMS Marguerite:

  was an  launched in 1915 and transferred to the Royal Australian Navy becoming HMAS Marguerite in 1919
  was a  launched in 1940 she became the civilian ship Weather Observer in 1947

Fictional ships
 HMS Marguerite, author C.S. Forester has Horatio Hornblower serving on a fictional HMS Marguerite in The Hand of Destiny

Royal Navy ship names